Helgøy is a former municipality in Troms county, Norway.  The  island municipality existed from 1886 until its dissolution in 1964.  It was located in the western part of the present-day Karlsøy Municipality.  The municipality included the islands of Helgøya, Grøtøya, and Nordkvaløya, large parts of the nearby islands of Rebbenesøya, Ringvassøya, Vannøya, and many smaller surrounding islands.  The administrative centre was located on the south side of the island of Helgøya in a small village where Helgøy Church is also located.

Name
The municipality is named after the island of Helgøya since the first Helgøy Church was built there. Thus the name means  or "the holy island". Historically, the municipal name was spelled Helgø (before about 1919). In 1919, the spelling was changed so that there was a "y" at the end due to a change in the spelling of "island" in a Norwegian spelling reform.

History
From ancient times, a Helgøy parish has existed. In 1838, municipal self-government was introduced in Norway (see formannskapsdistrikt), and the Helgøy parish was made a part of Karlsøy Municipality. Helgøy grew as a trading post under Christian Figenschou, but residents soon became dissatisfied with the municipal government based in Karlsøy.

The municipality of Helgøy was established on 1 September 1886 when the western part of the old Karlsøy Municipality was separated to form a municipality of its own. Helgøy Municipality had an initial population of 828. Despite being separated, the two municipalities still had a common priest, sheriff, and doctor, but all these were residents in Karlsøy. From 1886 to 1892, Christian Figenschou was the mayor of Helgøy.  After 1886, residents began developing a local town center on Helgøya island, with Helgøy Church, a rectory, a farm, and flourishing trade.  A small village grew up around the church site and a permanent school in the parish was added on Helgøya island.  Steam ships regularly stopped here and a post office was established.  After 1928, a doctor and sheriff were permanently located here.

During the 1960s, there were many municipal mergers across Norway due to the work of the Schei Committee. On 1 January 1964, a merger took place between the municipality of Helgøy and most of Karlsøy Municipality (except the mainland areas which became part of Lyngen Municipality). Prior to the merger, Helgøy had a population of 1,495.

Government
During its existence, this municipality was governed by a municipal council of elected representatives, which in turn elected a mayor.

Mayors
The mayors of Helgøy:

1886-1892: Christian Figenschou 
1893-1895: Guttorm Guttormsen Raste 
1896-1898: Edvard Raste 			
1899-1901: Christian Figenschau
1902-1903: Edvard Raste 			
1904-1907: Hans Raste 
1907-1909: Søren Hansen 
1910-1913: Hans Raste 
1914-1922: Peder Nilsen 
1923-1925: Hans Raste
1926-1934: Elias Olsen
1935-1941: Edvard Baardsen
1941-1941: Iwan Figenschou 
1941-1943: Matteus Grindberg 
1943-1943: Dmitri Figenschow 
1943-1943: Nils G. Rasthe 
1943-1945: John Olsen 
1945-1947: Edvard Baardsen 
1948-1963: Konrad Hansen

Municipal council
The municipal council  of Helgøy was made up of 15 representatives that were elected to four year terms.  The party breakdown of the final municipal council was as follows:

See also
List of former municipalities of Norway

References

External links

Weather information for Helgøy 

Karlsøy
Former municipalities of Norway
1886 establishments in Norway
1964 disestablishments in Norway